"Born to Be Blue" is a 1946 traditional pop torch song written by Mel Tormé and Robert Wells. It was first recorded by Tormé and Sonny Burke in 1946. It was revived by both singers and instrumentalists starting in the mid-1950s, and is considered a jazz standard.

Cover versions

See also
List of jazz standards

References

1940s jazz standards
1946 songs